Idia suffusalis is a species of litter moth of the family Erebidae. It is found in North America, including its type location, the Santa Rita Mountains in southeastern Arizona.

External links
Moths of Southeastern Arizona 

Herminiinae
Moths described in 1899